Belle van Zuylen – Madame de Charrière  is a 1993 Dutch historical film, directed by Digna Sinke.

A biography of Isabelle de Charrière and her friendship with Benjamin Constant.

This film got the Main Award of the 43rd International Filmfestival Mannheim-Heidelberg in 1994.

Cast
Will van Kralingen	... 	Belle van Zuylen
Laus Steenbeke	... 	Benjamin Constant
Kees Hulst	        ... 	Charles Emanuelle de Charrière
Patty Pontier	... 	Henriette de Monachon
Carla Hardy	... 	Germaine de Stael
Marieke van Leeuwen... 	Charlotte (actually sister-in-law Henriette de Charrière)
Joke van Leeuwen   ...     Louise de Charrière
Krijn ter Braak	... 	Jean Baptiste Suard
Kitty Courbois	... 	Mrs. Saurin
Gijs Scholten van Aschat...Mr Saurin
Carol van Herwijnen...     Benjamin Constant's father
Truus te Selle	... 	Augustine-Magdaleine Pourrat
Arthur Boni	... 	Vicar Henri-David de Chaillet
Ed Bauer	        ... 	Pierre Alexandre DuPeyrou
Mirjam de Rooij	...	Girl in carriage
Miryanna Boom      ...
Eric Corton

External links 
 
 trailer of the film on Youtube
 Information of SNG of the film with Awards and pictures

1993 films
1990s Dutch-language films
Films set in the 18th century
Films directed by Digna Sinke
Films set in the Netherlands
Dutch historical films
1990s historical films
Dutch biographical films
Cultural depictions of Dutch women
Cultural depictions of writers
Cultural depictions of classical musicians
1990s biographical films
Biographical films about writers